The O'Day 20 is an American trailerable sailboat that was designed by John Deknatel of C.R. Hunt & Associates as a pocket cruiser and first built in 1973.

The O'Day 20 is a lower cost follow-on design to the O'Day 22.

Production
The design was built by O'Day Corp. in the United States from 1973 until 1979, with 949 boats completed, but it is now out of production.

Design
The boat was intended as a first cruising sailboat for an owner stepping up from a daysailer. The design put an emphasis on spaciousness and simplicity.

The O'Day 20 is a recreational keelboat, built predominantly of fiberglass, with wood trim. It has a masthead sloop rig or optional Fractional rig, a raked stem, a slightly reverse transom, a transom-hung rudder controlled by a tiller and a fixed stub keel with a centerboard. It displaces  empty and carries  of lead ballast.

The boat is normally fitted with a small  outboard motor for docking and maneuvering.

The design has sleeping accommodation for four people, with a double "V"-berth in the bow cabin and two straight settee berths in the main cabin. The galley is located just aft of the bow cabin. The galley is equipped with a two-burner stove and a sink. The head is located in the bow cabin under the "V"-berth.

Operational history
In a 2010 review Steve Henkel wrote, "The O'Day 22 ... was introduced in 1972 and a year later the O'Day 20 came along. According to the yachting press of the time, the smaller O'Day 20 was a lower-priced follow-up to the similar O'Day 22. ... Best features: It is interesting to compare the O'Day 20 with her near sisterships, the O'Day 19 and 192, one longer and one shorter in LOD. For example, both these comps have more internal space than the O’Day 20. But the O'Day 20 has a slightly better Motion Index resulting from her extra 200 pounds of ballast, and slightly more speed due to her longer LWL. Worst features: Other than the above, we don't see much difference. Maybe the only really bad feature was in the higher new price..."

In a 1974 review in MotorBoating described the design as having, "four full-sized bunks, head, galley sink,
icebox and optional stove make her self-sufficient away from port. A tall rig and 3'11" draft (with centerboard down) make her a lively performer under sail. Four hundred pounds of lead ballast make her safely self-righting. And her shallow draft keel (14" centerboard up) and tabernacle stepped mast make her easy to trailer."

See also
List of sailing boat types

References

Keelboats
1970s sailboat type designs
Sailing yachts
Trailer sailers
Sailboat type designs by John Deknatel
Sailboat type designs by C. Raymond Hunt Associates
Sailboat types built by O'Day Corp.